Lee Island is a forested bar island in Marion County, West Virginia, United States, on the Tygart Valley River.

Lee Island (formerly Scout Island) is a privately owned bar island in the Tygart River Valley. 
1940’s and 1950’s was used by a Boy Scout troop as their private camp.  Since then it is visited by scouts with permission of the current owner.  A pavilion and camp sites can still be seen.

See also
List of islands of West Virginia

References

River islands of West Virginia
Landforms of Marion County, West Virginia